The Tibetan bunting (Emberiza koslowi) is a species of bird in the family Emberizidae. It is endemic to eastern side of the Tibetan Plateau.

Etymology
The specific name "koslowi" for this species was given after Russian explorer Pyotr Kozlov.

Description
The crown is black and there are white stripes at the head. The back is chestnut coloured.

Behaviour
The domed nest structure of this species appears to be unique amongst the Emberizinae buntings which have open nest structures. Female lays 3 or 4 eggs.

They eat grains in winter and insects, like butterflies, grasshoppers and beetles, in summer.

Main predators of Tibetan bunting are birds of prey like falcons and owls and mammals like foxes, weasels and badgers.

References

External links
Tibetan bunting photos and audio at The Macaulay Library of Cornell Lab of Ornithology

Tibetan bunting
Birds of Tibet
Endemic birds of China
Tibetan bunting
Taxonomy articles created by Polbot